The National Small-bore Rifle Association, the NSRA, is the national governing body for all Small-bore Rifle and Pistol Target Shooting in the United Kingdom, including Airgun and Match Crossbow Shooting.

The NSRA is based at The Lord Roberts Centre, within the grounds of the National Shooting Centre in Surrey. National postal competitions are organised all year round, together with a series of meetings, culminating in the Bisley Rifle Meeting, or National Meeting in August, preceded by the Scottish Rifle Meeting in June/July.

In 2006, the NSRA founded the National Association of Target Shooting Sports working group in association with the National Rifle Association and Clay Pigeon Shooting Association, to explore the practicalities and benefits of a merger between the bodies. The project was shelved in July 2009 following the withdrawal of the CPSA, followed by the NRA.

History

Formation
The NSRA was originally formed in 1901 as the Society of Working Mens Rifle Clubs. A series of heavy defeats during 1899 in the Second Boer War had demonstrated a lack of marksmanship ability amongst British military-age men, whilst the Boers had been able to pick off British officers at ranges in excess of 1,000yards. Although the National Rifle Association had been founded in 1859, ranges suitable for large-calibre service rifles were necessarily rural and costly to travel to. Cost of ammunition for civilians was also a limitation. With the adoption of the sub-calibre Morris aiming tube in 1883 and development of the .22 Long Rifle cartridge in 1887 it became apparent that principles of marksmanship could be taught and trained using these small calibre "miniature" rifles on local or even indoor ranges located in towns and cities.

Major General Charles Edward Luard was at the forefront of this line of thinking and pressured the British Government to sponsor such a movement from 1899 until 23 March 1901 when a meeting of MPs, city Mayors and dignitaries representing many Working Men's Clubs, passed a resolution founding the Society.

The organisation was founded on the premise of being funded primarily by gentlemen, with the working classes expected to join the clubs and avail themselves of this opportunity. In many ways this was a spiritual update on the ancient English law requiring all men and boys to practice archery, facilitated by the local clergy and gentry. Notable champions of this movement included Arthur Conan-Doyle, who constructed a 100yard range at his Undershaw home and founded a rifle club there, providing shooting for local men. As a champion of such clubs, Conan-Doyle sat on the Rifle Clubs Committee of the National Rifle Association. Many modern rifle clubs still benefit from this legacy, having inherited the grounds and quarries that land owners made available to these new Miniature Rifle Clubs.

Luard took the Chair of the SWMRC's Executive Committee, with Earl Roberts of Kandahar acting as President and affording the group enormous publicity through his celebrity status as a celebrated Field Marshal. The 15th Duke of Norfolk was appointed as Chair of the non-executive Council.

In 1902 with around 80 affiliated clubs, the Society of Working Mens Rifle Clubs entered into co-operation with The British Rifle League - an organisation with similar aims operated by popular magazine "The Regiment". In collaboration they held their first shooting match and the first "Miniature Bisley" was held at The Crystal Palace in March 1903 as a small-bore version of the NRA's Imperial meeting - by now moved from Wimbledon Common to Bisley Camp in Surrey.

The two organisations merged later in 1903 becoming the Society of Miniature Rifle Clubs (SMRC), a name it held until 1947 when it renamed itself the National Small-bore Rifle Association (NSRA).

In 1904 Earl Roberts retired from active military service and devoted himself to the newly merged SMRC, driving a major fundraising campaign and seeking to found a club in every town. In 1906 he successfully gained recognition from the Army Council, putting the SMRC on an equal footing with the NRA and exempting members of affiliated clubs from the Gun Licence Duty, which was the considerable sum of 10 Shillings. The exemption from this cost enabled a new wave of clubs, resulting in the training of tens of thousands of men by the outbreak of the First World War.

The First World War saw a downturn in fortunes for the SMRC. In 1914, Earl Roberts passed at the age of 82, having developed pneumonia whilst visiting troops in France. The Presidency remained vacant until 1917 when Field Marshal Earl Haig was appointed as President. By the end of the war the number of affiliated clubs had fallen dramatically to around 1,500 as many club members had either lost their lives or were no longer inclined to shoot after the horrors of the trenches. The Firearms Act 1920 - enacted in fear of growing socialism and the shadow of the Russian Revolution - further constrained the ability of clubs to operate.

World War 2
The Society worked to reverse this trend, upsizing through several London bases and having 2374 affiliated clubs by 1939. The Second World War saw a growth in clubs. Just as many original clubs from 1902 had grown from volunteer militia groups, so new clubs formed around the Home Guard Units in areas where no clubs existed already. SMRC affiliations grew to 4019 clubs by the end of 1945. The War Office continued to support these clubs despite having stood down the Home Guard in 1944. The war also saw the Society move after their London Headquarters was destroyed in May 1941, resulting in the loss of the Society's records as well as the destruction of 48 valuable trophies. Their printers were also hit that night, destroying their stock of targets, as were the offices of the Society's solicitors and auditors. Nonetheless, they were fully operational just three months later from new headquarters in the relative safety of Richmond, Surrey.

Post-War
During the Second World War, the Society suspended all airgun events to focus solely on cartridge shooting. Post-war the Association showed little interest in redeveloping it. This gap was filled by the emergence of the Air Rifle Clubs Association (ARCA) in the 1960s. This led to a split where the NSRA was the recognised authority for international small-bore and airgun shooting despite ARCA being the de facto domestic authority on airgun shooting. This changed with the recognition of ARCA by the Central Council for Physical Recreation following an intervention by CCPR chairman the Duke of Edinburgh. CCPR recognition led to a rebrand from ARCA to the National Air Rifle and Pistol Association (NARPA). NARPA organised a National Airgun Championship, initially at Rushden, Northamptonshire, and later at RAF Cosford in Shropshire. Under pressure from this new organisation the NSRA launched their own British Air Gun Championships in 1974 with the inaugural meeting held at the National Sports Centre for Wales, in Sophia Gardens, Cardiff, and remaining there until 1990 when it was held in Manchester ahead of the 1991 European Air Gun Championships which were held in the same Manchester venue. In 1980 NARPA closed, with the NSRA absorbing their responsibilities.

Over the decades, various attempts were made to establish a National Range for the hosting of Small-bore Meetings. In 1977 a demountable range was developed that could be erected annually on Bisley's Century Range, and the Society (now renamed the NSRA) made the decision to leave London for the last time, setting up base in 1980 on Bisley Camp which was rapidly being developed as a National Shooting Centre.

In 1991, the purpose-built National Indoor Shooting Centre was opened at Aldersley Leisure Village near Wolverhampton. The centre was located adjacent to a 100yard small-bore range operated by Wolverhampton Smalbore Rifle Association and hosted local clubs but also provided a more central location for the British Air Gun Championships, which were held there between 1992 and 2001, moving to Bisley in 2002 following the opening of the Lord Roberts Centre. Opening in 2001, the LRC was a state-of-the-art small-bore and airgun range complex constructed for the 2002 Commonwealth Games, featuring an Olympic-grade Sius Ascor electronic scoring system and office space for the NSRA. The NSRA offices moved from "Lord Roberts House", a building just inside the entrance to Bisley Camp. This office was sold to the Clay Pigeon Shooting Association, who moved to the camp from leased premises in Corby and renamed the building "Edmonton House".

Construction of the Lord Roberts Centre

The Lord Roberts Centre was a controversial building from its inception. Oriented North-East rather than due North, early morning shooters on the outdoor ranges were blinded by the sun rising over the targets. This was compounded by the decision not to include cross-range baffles, which are a common feature on similar range complexes in Europe. The first floor - where the airgun range was located - was criticised for using a sprung construction which produced noticeable bounce on the firing point. Despite this, Niccolò Campriani scored a 599 and a perfect 600 score at the British Airgun Championships in 2013. Most notable however was the financial strain that this large facility placed on the NSRA, which had no organisational experience operating a dedicated range complex. With the prohibition on both centrefire and small-bore pistols in 1997, visitor numbers from air gun and rifle shooters to the centre were insufficient to cover the operating costs, resulting in the Association's commercial subsidiary seeking other sources of income, including wedding receptions and a long-term deal that saw the upstairs hall configured as a roller-hockey rink.

International Competition
Selection for ISSF smallbore competitions such as the World Championships is now managed by British Shooting. The NSRA continues to compete in a number of historic rifle matches, predominantly against the United States and Commonwealth nations such as Canada and South Africa. These are marked from the ISSF events by mostly being fired at both 50metres and 100yards.

International Post Match ("The Dewar Match")
Sir Thomas Dewar presented the International Post Match Trophy to the NSRA in 1909 for an annual team match to be conducted by post. This allowed an annual match to take place without the expense of international travel. Contested initially by Great Britain and the United States, Australia won in 1972 and South Africa in 1998.

Teams of 20 are selected and fire 20 shots at each of 50metres and 100yards on a home range, with scores compared by post. The British team typically hold trials and shoot at Appleton Rifle Club in Cheshire. The US team typically shoot at the US National Matches at Camp Perry (or more recently Camp Atterbury).

Randle Match
Similar to the Dewar Match, the Randle is an annual international postal for ladies teams of 10. First contested in 1952, it has been won by the United States or Great Britain every year except 1997 when South Africa won.

Pershing Trophy International Team Match
The Pershing Trophy was presented to the National Rifle Association of America by General John J. Pershing in 1931 for use in a shoulder-to-shoulder international smallbore rifle competition. The 1931 match was won by Great Britain. The match was initially held at uneven intervals, determined by attendance of a visiting team. In 1969 it was agreed to set the interval at eight years, interspersed with a return match by the US to Bisley, resulting in a team travelling once every four years. When in Britain, teams compete for the Earl Roberts Trophy, with the event known as the Roberts Match.

America has won 11 of the 13 Pershing matches (Britain won the first two) and 5 of the 7 Roberts Matches.

 The 13th match was held in 2022 at Camp Atterbury, Indiana. The match was postponed from 2021 due to travel restrictions.

Bisley Rifle Meeting

The first meeting was held in 1922 and has been held annually with the exception of the war years and 2020-21 when it was cancelled due to COVID-19.

The meeting is normally held at the National Shooting Centre for a week starting on the third Saturday before August Bank Holiday Monday. Most competitions are shot on about 200 firing points sited on the 200-yard firing point of Century Range. Shooting is predominantly at 50metres and 100yards, with the exception of the Queen Alexandra Cup which includes a 25yard component. Three-Position events and the Double English match are fired at the Lord Roberts Centre on electronic targets broadly under ISSF Rules. The entry for the meeting is about 900 competitors.

In 2022, the NSRA celebrated the "Bisley 100" Centenary edition of the meeting. The opening shot was performed by Michael More-Molyneux DL, Lord Lieutenant of Surrey on behalf of the Queen, patron of the Association. A number of additional "1922" events were added to the programme, including rapid-fire and timed shoots, derived from original 1922 targets (with scoring rings shrunk to account for improved modern rifles and ammunition). The "Earl Roberts" British Prone Championship was won by Lina Jones following a tie-shoot, the second time she has won the title.

Programme

 Weekend Aggregate - 60 shots each at 50metres and 100yards, shot over the first weekend
 Grand Aggregate - 100 shots each at 50metres and 100yards, shot Monday-Thursday
 British Prone Rifle Championship (the "Earl Roberts")
 First stage on Friday, top half or third from each squad progress to second stage (depending on whether there are two or three squads)
 Second stage on the second Saturday morning, top 20 progress to Final
 Final on the second Saturday afternoon
 Home Countries International Match - Teams of 10 from each of the Home Nations (including Isle of Man & Channel Islands)
 British Men's 3x40 and Women's 3x20 Championships - Fired on electronic targets
 Double English Match - fired on electronic targets.
 Finals of the Astor Club Team Championship (club teams of 6), the Queen Alexandra Cup (county teams of 6 and individual) and the NSRA/Eley Competitions in Prone and 3P rifle (individual), the initial stages of which are run as postal competitions.
 During the "First Weekend" volunteers run the "SMRC Meeting" –  a two-day event for Historic Arms in timelined designs (Classic = pre-1919, Veteran = 1919-1945, Open Historic = pre-1946 and some "Extended period" courses for basic rifles up to about 1960 design. Courses of fire for Prone, Offhand (Standing unsupported) a "new" Standing Supported course based on 19th-century practices:  Classes of rifle include Target, Sporting, Military Training and – unusually for the NSRA – allow "pistol-calibre" rifles.

"Earl Roberts" British Prone Championship

See also
 British Shooting
 National Rifle Association (United Kingdom)

References

External links
 
 
 
 
 British Shooting Sports Council

Sports governing bodies in the United Kingdom
Rifle associations
Shooting sports in the United Kingdom
Shooting sports organizations
Sports organizations established in 1901
1901 establishments in the United Kingdom